Swindon is a large town in Wiltshire, United Kingdom.

Swindon may also refer to:

Swindon, Wiltshire
 Borough of Swindon, unitary authority covering the Swindon area
 Swindon (UK Parliament constituency)
 Swindon railway station, a major railway junction
 Swindon Town F.C., the town's football team
 Swindon Works, the former railway locomotive works.
elsewhere
 Swindon Village, Gloucestershire, England
 Swindon, Staffordshire, England
 Swindon, Ontario, Canada, now known as Perry

See also 
Swinden, a village in North Yorkshire, England
Swinton (disambiguation)